Bagh-e Bakhshi (also Romanized as Bāgh-e Bakhshī) is a village in Zozan Rural District, Jolgeh Zozan District, Khaf County, Razavi Khorasan Province, Iran. At the 2006 census, its population was 1,391, in 288 families.

See also 

 List of cities, towns and villages in Razavi Khorasan Province

References 

Populated places in Khaf County